The Aydın Pınarbaşı-Aytepe Gondola is a two-station aerial lift line of gondola type in Aydın serving hilltop Aytepe from Pınarbaşı.

The project of an aerial lift line to provide easy access between the recreational resorts Pınarbaşı and Aytepe (literally: Moon Hill) goes back to 2006. The construction of the line began in September 2008.

Cost 2.620 million (approx. US$1.578 million in March 2009), the gondola line went in service in the beginning of March 2009. The operation was suspended beginning of April 2009 by the newly elected mayor right after the 2009 local elections with the rationale "lack of proficient personnel". Due to pressure by local citizens, the abondened facility reopened in September 2011 for free-of-charge use following overhaul works. However, the line stopped shortly after again. On October 8, 2012, the gondola line became operational for the third time. It runs on weekdays between 8:00-17:00 and on weekends between 9:00-17:30 hours. Since the line has no illumination, its operation in the darkness is not possible due to security reasons. It is planned to add necessary illumination installation to extend the operation hours. A total of six gondolas each capable of six passengers, which run in two sets of three cabins in a row, can transport 216 people hourly. The trip takes 5 minutes. The fare is 1.50.

Features
 Length: 
 Height difference: 
 Speed: max. 3 m/s
 Ridership: 216 hourly
 Cabin capacity: 6
 Engine power: 100 kW
 Cable diameter: 41 mm
 Fare: 1.50
 Terminals:
 Pınarbaşı 
 Aytepe

See also
 List of gondola lifts in Turkey

References

Gondola lifts in Turkey
2009 establishments in Turkey
Transport infrastructure completed in 2009
Tourist attractions in Aydın